Jharana Das (1945 – 2 December 2022) was an Indian Ollywood actress and journalist. She was known for her contributions to the Odia film industry.

Life and career
Jharana Das started her career in the 1960s as a child artist and announcer for All India Radio, Cuttack where she produced creative content across drama, song and film. She later also worked as an assistant station director of Doordarshan in Cuttack.

Times Now stated that Das "chose a career in the movies at a time when not many chose to walk the path" and reported that she had to deal with family opposition to follow her calling. Her brother, who was in the Indian Air Force, convinced their family to allow Jharana to pursue her choice. She had taken voice culture training in Kolkata which may have added a dimension to her performance in films.

When she switched to acting, she became well known for her performances in films such as Amadu Bata, Bari, Sri Jagannath, Adina Megha, and Abhinetri. Other roles include Hisab Nikas, Pujafula,  Malajanha, and Heera Nella, for which she won many awards. Overall, she appeared in approximately 40 films as the female lead.

She was also credited for directing a biographical documentary film on Harekrushna Mahatab, a freedom fighter and former chief minister.

She was the winner of the Lifetime Contribution Award of Jaydev Puraskar in 1977 and a beneficiary of Guru Kelucharan Mohapatra Award for lifetime achievement in 2016.

She was also assistant station director of Doordarshan in Cuttack and a trained classical dancer.

Her husband was the cameraman on her film Malajanha.

Death
Das died at her residence in Cuttack on 2 December 2022. Her death was recognised by the President of India, Droupadi Murmu. Odisha Chief Minister Naveen Patnaik also expressed grief over the death of the actress and announced that her last rites will be performed with full state honours. Patnaik said in a statement Union Education Minister Dharmendra Pradhan also gave condolences over Das's death.

Explanatory notes

References 

1945 births
2022 deaths
People from Cuttack district
Actresses in Odia cinema
Indian actresses